Jake Johnson is an American football wide receiver for the Texas A&M Aggies of the Southeastern Conference.

Early years
Johnson grew up in Athens, Georgia and attended Oconee County High School. He played with his older brother, quarterback Max Johnson, for his first two seasons of high school and caught 60 passes for 845 yards and 14 touchdowns during his sophomore season. Johnson had 37 receptions for 787 yards and 10 touchdowns as a junior. He caught 45 passes for 745 yards and eight touchdowns as a senior. After the season, Johnson played in the 2022 All-American Bowl.

Johnson was rated as a four-star recruit and the best tight end prospect in the 2022 recruiting class. He initially committed to play college football at LSU where his older brother Max was playing. Johnson later de-committed after his brother entered the NCAA transfer portal. He ultimately signed a letter of intent to play at Texas A&M. Max Johnson transferred to Texas A&M after his brother's commitment.

College career
Johnson joined the Texas A&M Aggies as an early enrollee in January 2022.

Personal life
Johnson is the son of Pro Bowl and Super Bowl quarterback Brad Johnson and the nephew of former Georgia and Miami head coach Mark Richt.

References

External links
Texas A&M Aggies bio

Living people
American football tight ends
Texas A&M Aggies football players
Players of American football from Georgia (U.S. state)
Year of birth missing (living people)